Doraemon is a Japanese manga series written and illustrated by Fujiko F. Fujio.

Doraemon may also refer to:

Doraemon (character), a robotic cat from the future
Doraemon (1973 anime), which ran from April to September 1973
Doraemon (1979 anime), which ran from 1979 to 2005
Doraemon (2005 anime), which has run since 2005
Doraemon (1986 video game), by Hudson Soft
Doraemon: Nobita to Mittsu no Seireiseki, a 1997 Nintendo 64 video game
Stand by Me Doraemon, a 2014 3D computer animated film
Stand by Me Doraemon 2, a 2020 3D computer animated film

See also